, officially , is a district of Chiyoda, Tokyo, Japan. Currently it consists of only 2-chōme. As of April 1, 2007, its population is 498. Its postal code is 101-0046.

This district is located on the northern part of Chiyoda Ward. It borders Kanda-Sudachō on the north, Kanda-Sudachō and Kanda-Kajichō on the east, (across Kanda-Keisatsu-dōri Avenue) Uchi-Kanda on the south, and Kanda-Tsukasamachi on the west.

A commercial neighborhood, this district is home to the head office of Hayakawa Publishing, Japan's largest science fiction publisher.

Education
 operates public elementary and junior high schools. Chiyoda Elementary School (千代田小学校) is the zoned elementary school for Kanda-Tachō 2-chōme. There is a freedom of choice system for junior high schools in Chiyoda Ward, and so there are no specific junior high school zones.

References

Districts of Chiyoda, Tokyo